Samuel Walser (born June 5, 1992) is a Swiss professional ice hockey center. He is currently playing for HC Fribourg-Gottéron of Switzerland's National League (NL).

Playing career
He previously played as a youth and made his professional debut with the Kloten Flyers. On May 14, 2013, Walser left the Kloten Flyers to sign a multi-year contract with HC Davos.

After five seasons with Davos, Walser left as a free agent, signing a four-year contract with his third Swiss club, HC Fribourg-Gottéron, starting from the 2018–19 season.

International play
Walser participated at the 2012 World Junior Ice Hockey Championships as a member of the Switzerland men's national junior ice hockey team.

Career statistics

Regular season and playoffs

International

References

External links

1992 births
Living people
HC Davos players
HC Fribourg-Gottéron players
EHC Kloten players
Swiss ice hockey centres
People from Olten
Sportspeople from the canton of Solothurn